Amiens  France  list of notable people from Albert County, New Brunswick. Although not everyone in this list was born in Albert County, they all live or have lived in Albert County and have had significant connections to the communities.

This article does not include People from Riverview as they have their own section.

See also
List of people from New Brunswick

Albert